Minnalkodi is a 1937 Indian Tamil-language action thriller film, directed by K. Amarnath and produced by Ramaniklal and Mohanlal. The film stars K. T. Rukmini, Srinivasa Rao, and S. S. Kokko (Real name: Pasupuleti Srinivasulu Naidu). Released on 30 October 1937, it became a commercial success, but no print of the film is known to survive, making it a lost film.

Plot 
Mohini is a young girl whose father dies, leaving her and her male servant homeless. Her wily uncle unfairly takes her property. In their wanderings, Mohini and the servant come across Minnalkodi, a dacoit, and protect him from the police. The injured Minnalkodi declares Mohini the leader of his gang and dies. Mohini goes about in the guise of a man as Minnalkodi and kills her uncle and others who had harmed her earlier, but she is a good thief who robs the rich only to help the poor. Jayakumar, a police inspector, tries to capture her but is unable to make much progress. In the jungle, he comes across Mohini, without her disguise, and falls in love with her. When he learns that she is, in fact, Minnalkodi, he persuades her to change her ways, and they marry.

Production 
Minnalkodi was among Tamil cinema's earliest action films, then known as "stunt films", and followed the Robin Hood concept of robbing the rich to help the poor. It was directed by K. Amarnath and produced by Ramaniklal and Mohanlal under Mohan Pictures, this being one of the Bombay-based company's earliest Tamil films. K. T. Rukmini, an Anglo-Indian actress, played Mohini. She modelled her screen mannerisms on the Hindi film actress Gohar Mamajiwala, and draped her sari in the Gujarati style. She also took influence from the acting style of Fearless Nadia. S. S. Koko, a stunt-comedian, played Mohini's servant. Srinivasa Rao played Jayakumar, the police inspector who falls in love with Mohini. Other supporting roles were played by Gogia Pasha, Subbulakshmi, Alamu, K. B. Rao and Usharani. Minnalkodi was filmed in black-and-white, featured only three songs, and its final length measured .

Release and reception 
Minnalkodi was released on 30 October 1937 and emerged a major commercial success, besides propelling Rukmini to stardom. No print of the film is known to survive, making it a lost film.

References

Bibliography

External links 
 
 

1930s action thriller films
1930s Tamil-language films
1937 films
1937 lost films
Cross-dressing in Indian films
Indian action thriller films
Indian black-and-white films
Indian swashbuckler films
Lost Indian films